Ma Tseuk Leng, sometimes transliterated as Ma Tseuk Ling, is an area in Sha Tau Kok, North District, Hong Kong.

The area contains the villages of Ma Tseuk Leng Sheung and Ma Tseuk Leng Ha. Ma Tseuk Leng San Uk Ha, part of Ma Tseuk Leng Ha, is a historic Hakka walled village.

Administration
Ma Tseuk Leng is a recognized village under the New Territories Small House Policy. It is one of the villages represented within the Sha Tau Kok District Rural Committee. For electoral purposes, Ma Tseuk Leng is part of the Sha Ta constituency, which is currently represented by Ko Wai-kei.

History
Ma Tseuk Leng Sheung is a Hakka village that was historically inhabited by nine clans. Some of them left and the remaining clans were the Tsang, the Yeung, the Yau, the Mo and the Lee. The first settlers of the village were the Tsang and the Yeung. They arrived in 1655. The Tsang had moved from Changle in Guangdong province and have the same ancestor with the Tsang of Sam A Tsuen and Lai Chi Wo.

When the ban on human settlement of coastal areas of the Great Clearance was lifted in 1668, the coastal defense was reinforced. Twenty-one fortified mounds, each manned with an army unit, were created along the border of Xin'an County, and at least five of them were located in present-day Hong Kong. 1) The Tuen Mun Mound, believed to have been built on Castle Peak or Kau Keng Shan, was manned by 50 soldiers. 2) The Kowloon Mound on Lion Rock and 3) the Tai Po Tau Mound northwest of Tai Po Old Market had each 30 soldiers. 4) The Ma Tseuk Leng Mound stood between present-day Sha Tau Kok and Fan Ling and was manned by 50 men. 5) The fifth one at Fat Tong Mun, probably on today's Tin Ha Shan Peninsula, was an observation post manned by 10 soldiers. In 1682, these forces were re-organized and manned by detachments from the Green Standard Army with reduced strength.

According to the 1688 Gazetteer of Xin'an County, only two villages were established in the modern day Sha Tau Kok area: Ma Tseuk Leng and Man Uk Pin. Both were small agricultural settlements. Wo Hang, although existing, was not recognized.

The villages of Ma Tseuk Leng (upper and lower), Yim Tso Ha, Wu Shek Kok and Au Ha formed a yeuk (a form of oath-sworn, inter-village, mutual-aid alliance.

At the time of the 1911 census, the total population of Ma Tseuk Leng was 125. The number of males was 47.

Features
Two ancestral halls of the Tsang were built in Ma Tseuk Leng Sheung. One of them was built in the 19th century. It was rebuilt in 1929 and renovated in 1951. The other one collapsed before the Japanese Occupation of Hong Kong.

See also
 Walled villages of Hong Kong
 Robin's Nest, a nearby hill.

References

External links

 Delineation of area of existing village Ma Tseuk Leng Ha (Sha Tau Kok) for election of resident representative (2019 to 2022)
 Delineation of area of existing village Ma Tseuk Leng Sheung (Sha Tau Kok) for election of resident representative (2019 to 2022)
 Pictures of Tsang Ancestral Hall, Sheung Ma Tseuk Leng
 Pictures of Ma Tseuk Leng:  

Walled villages of Hong Kong
Sha Tau Kok
Villages in North District, Hong Kong